Falling Forward may refer to:

 Falling Forward (Sandi Patty album), 2007
 Falling Forward (Margaret Becker album), 1998
 Falling Forward (Julia Fordham album), 1994